Jakov is a Croatian and Serbian masculine given name, a variant of the biblical names Jacob and James. Often the nicknames of Jaki/Јаки, Jakša/Јакша and Jakica/Јакица will be used for people bearing the name.
It may refer to:

 Jakov (bishop), Serbian medieval archbishop
 Jakov Bienenfeld, Croatian entrepreneur and developer
 Jakov Brdar, Slovenian-Bosnian sculptor
 Jakov Cindro, Croatian politician
 Jakov Fak, Croatian-Slovenian biathlete
 Jakov Filipović, Croatian football player
Jakov Geller, Russian Grand Master
 Jakov Gojun, Croatian handball player
 Jakov Gotovac, Croatian composer and conductor
 Jakov Grcić, Croatian futsal player
 Jakov Ignjatović, Serbian-Hungarian novelist and prose writer
 Jakov Lind, Austrian-British writer
 Jakov Mikalja, Italian linguist and lexicographer of Slavic ancestry
 Jakov Nenadović, Serbian military commander and politician
 Jakov Sedlar, Croatian film director and producer
 Jakov Surać, Croatian football player
 Jakov Vladović, Croatian basketball player
 Jakov Vranković, Croatian handball player
 Jakov Xoxa, Albanian writer
 Ivan Jakov Džoni, Croatian football player

See also
Yakov
Jakovljević

Croatian masculine given names
Serbian masculine given names